In mathematics, a Lüroth quartic is a nonsingular quartic plane curve containing the 10 vertices of a complete pentalateral.

References

Algebraic curves